Avio is a comune in Trentino in north Italy. Avio occupies a flat plain, bounded by the Monte Baldo from east and by the Monti Lessini from west.

Main sights
Castle of Avio
Pieve of Avio
Parish church of Santa Maria Assunta, housing a 17th-century stucco decoration by Giovanni Angelo Sala.

Economy
The area of Avio is especially renowned for the production of wine, such as the autochthonous Enantio.

References

External links
 Homepage of the city

Cities and towns in Trentino-Alto Adige/Südtirol